The 2023 ECAC Hockey men's ice hockey tournament was the 62nd tournament in league history. It was played between March 3 and March 18, 2023. By winning the tournament, Colgate received ECAC Hockey's automatic bid to the 2023 NCAA Division I men's ice hockey tournament.

Format
The tournament features four rounds of play. The teams that finish above fifth place in the standings received a bye to the quarterfinal round. In the first round, the fifth and twelfth seeds, the sixth and eleventh seeds, the seventh and tenth seeds and the eighth and ninth seeds played a single-elimination game with the winners advancing to the quarterfinals. In the quarterfinals the one seed played the lowest remaining seed, the second seed played the second-lowest remaining seed, the third seed played the third-lowest remaining seed and the fourth seed played the fourth-lowest remaining seed each in a best-of-three series with the winners of these the series advancing to the semifinals. In the semifinals the top remaining seed played the lowest remaining seed while the two remaining teams play against each other. The winners of the semifinals play in the championship game, and no third-place game is played. All series after the quarterfinals are single-elimination games. The tournament champion receives an automatic bid to the 2023 NCAA Division I Men's Ice Hockey Tournament.

Conference standings

Bracket
Teams are reseeded for the semifinals

Note: * denotes overtime period(s)

Results
Note: All game times are local.

First Round

(5) Colgate vs. (12) Dartmouth

(6) Clarkson vs. (11) Brown

(7) Rensselaer vs. (10) Yale

(8) Union vs. (9) Princeton

Quarterfinals

(1) Quinnipiac vs. (10) Yale

(2) Harvard vs. (9) Princeton

(3) Cornell vs. (6) Clarkson

(4) St. Lawrence vs. (5) Colgate

Semifinals

(1) Quinnipiac vs. (5) Colgate

(2) Harvard vs. (3) Cornell

Championship

(2) Harvard vs. (5) Colgate

Tournament awards

All-Tournament Team
F Ross Mitton (Colgate)
F Alex Young (Colgate)
F Alex Laferriere (Harvard)
D Henry Thrun (Harvard)
D Zach Metsa (Quinnipiac)
G Carter Gylander* (Colgate)
* Most Outstanding Player(s)

References

ECAC Hockey Men's Ice Hockey Tournament
ECAC Hockey Men's Ice Hockey Tournament
ECAC Men's Ice Hockey Hockey Tournament